The Tengri Unitrade CARGO is an official of Kazakhstan Railways forwarding cargo agent.

Tengri Unitrade Cargo has implemented simplified tariffs and standardised freight contracts.
"Tengri Unitrade CARGO" recently pioneered a new system that microwaves tank wagons to help extract heavy oil residues.

References

External links
 Official site 

Railway companies of Kazakhstan